The Badjiri people, also written Budjari or Badyidi, are an Australian Aboriginal people of just north of the Paroo River, close to the southern border of Queensland.
 
They are not to be confused with the Pitjara/Bidjara people of the Warrego River area or the Bidjara/Bitjara people of the Bulloo River area.

Country

Their eastern limits were around Barringun, Tinnenburra, Tuen, and Cunnamulla. They were also present at Caiwarro and about the eastern side of Currawinya.

Language

The Badjiri people spoke the Badjiri language, now extinct.

Alternative names
 Baderi
 Bädjäri
 Badjedi
 Badjeri, Baddyeri
 Badjidi
 Byjerri
 Poidgerry

Source:

Notes

Citations

Sources

External links 

 Photographs of the Bidjara Repatriation Ceremony at the Augathella Yumba, April 2012, State Library of Queensland

Aboriginal peoples of Queensland